On 4 and 5 June 2021, insurgents attacked the Solhan and Tadaryat villages in the Yagha Province of Burkina Faso. The massacres left at least 174 people dead. Insurgents have been attacking the Sahel Region, along the border with Mali, since Islamists captured parts of Mali in 2013.

Attacks
The attackers also raided the community's motorbikes and cattle.

Hours later in the early morning of 5 June 2021, insurgents attacked Solhan village in Burkina Faso, killing at least 160 civilians, including 20 children, and wounding 40 others. Around 2 am, the attackers, mounted on around 20 motorcycles, targeted first the Volunteers for the Defense of the Homeland (VDP), an anti-jihadist civilian defense force, before they burned homes and a market. A nearby mine was also attacked, Solhan being a centre for gold mining. The attackers left around dawn, some three hours before police response forces arrived in the village. Upon leaving the village the attackers left a number of improvised explosive devices on the roads leading into the village.  These were disarmed by engineers from the Burkinabé army in the following days.

The attacks are thought to have been the deadliest in Burkina Faso for five years. The dead from Solhan have been buried in three mass graves by local residents.

According to government spokesman Ousseni Tamboura, the attack in Solhan was carried out primarily by child soldiers between the ages of 12 and 14.

Response
The government blamed terrorists for the attack; however no group has since claimed responsibility for the massacre. The president, Roch Kaboré, issued a statement of condolences about the attack stating; "I bow before the memory of the hundreds of civilians killed in this barbaric attack and extend my condolences to the families of the victims." Kaboré cancelled a planned trip to Lomé, Togo because of the incidents.

A 72-hour period of national mourning was declared by the government. Some women in the country planned to wear all white on 7 June 2021 as a mark of respect for those killed.  The Burkinabé National Police have redeployed units in response to the massacres and in anticipation of further attacks.

António Guterres, secretary-general of the United Nations, who have thousands of peacekeepers stationed in the country, stated that he was "outraged" by the attacks. Pope Francis mentioned the Solhan massacre in his Angelus prayers and stated that Africa needs peace and not violence.

Jama'at Nasr al-Islam wal Muslimin denied responsibility for the attack and condemned it.

See also
List of terrorist incidents in 2021

References

2021 in Burkina Faso
2021 mass shootings in Africa
2021 murders in Burkina Faso
21st-century mass murder in Burkina Faso
June 2021 crimes in Africa
Massacres in 2021
Massacres in Burkina Faso
Terrorist incidents in Africa in 2021
Terrorist incidents in Burkina Faso
Yagha Province
Jihadist insurgency in Burkina Faso